A2Z is a Philippine free-to-air blocktime broadcast television network based in Quezon City, with its studios located in Ortigas Center, Pasig. It serves as a flagship property of ZOE Broadcasting Network in partnership with ABS-CBN Corporation as its main content provider, through a blocktime agreement. A2Z's flagship television station is DZOE-TV which carries the VHF Channel 11 (analog broadcast), and UHF Channel 20 (digital broadcast; since November 12, 2020). The network's name is an abbreviation derived from the first letter of the names of two parent companies, ABS-CBN and ZOE, the number of the now-recalled channel frequency of the former network (which is now owned by Advanced Media Broadcasting System's All TV), and the Latin alphabet letters from the first letter A to the last letter Z, which means it has everything from A to Z.

Background

ZOE TV-11
DZOE-TV Channel 11, also known as ZOE TV-11 was launched in 1998 after being acquired from Delta Broadcasting System. It served as the television arm of Jesus is Lord Church led by Eddie Villanueva. In 2005, ZOE TV-11 was leased by Citynet Network Marketing and Productions, subsidiary of GMA Network, to serve as originating station for its secondary television networks QTV and GMA News TV (now GTV). However, on April 24, 2019, GMA/Citynet announced that it will terminate its blocktime agreement with ZOE Broadcasting by the end of May 2019. GMA News TV disaffiliated from ZOE TV-11 on June 4, 2019, before the channel signed off the next day.

On June 22, 2020, ZOE TV-11 returned on air and carried the feed of Light TV as part of its test broadcast operations, but on June 26, the simulcast was replaced by Hillsong Channel, which is owned by Trinity Broadcasting Network, before reverting to Light TV feed on July 11. It was rumored to be part of marketing the channel to either possibly continuing the analog simulcast of their sister station UHF 33 or for blocktime / channel leasing.

ABS-CBN shutdown and blocktime rumors

On May 5, 2020, the broadcast operations of ABS-CBN Corporation, including Channel 2, S+A, Radyo Patrol, My Only Radio, and all digital television channels of ABS-CBN TV Plus and Direct broadcast via satellite of Sky Direct and AMCARA (on June 30) were put off the air after the National Telecommunications Commission (NTC) and Solicitor General Jose Calida issued a cease-and-desist order demanding ABS-CBN to immediately cease all of its free TV and radio broadcasting upon the expiration of its legislative broadcast franchise. The Congress later rejected ABS-CBN's application for franchise renewal on July 10, and the NTC recalled all the broadcast frequencies (including its now-defunct sister networks S+A, Yey! and Asianovela Channel) assigned to ABS-CBN on September 10. Since 2017, ABS-CBN was subjected to disputes with the government of President Rodrigo Duterte due to several issues such as campaign advertisement controversies during the 2016 election, accusations of political meddling and unjust reporting, and the legality of the operations of digital television channel Kapamilya Box Office (KBO), among others.

ABS-CBN partially resumed its programming through the launch of its cable and satellite television network Kapamilya Channel on June 13, where it carried ABS-CBN's dramas and live entertainment shows, educational and current affairs programming before the May 5 stoppage.

Since 2017, ZOE Broadcasting Network and ABS-CBN Corporation were reportedly holding talks for possible airtime lease of Channel 11 or acquisition of the network itself if the issues regarding ABS-CBN's now-expired broadcast franchise were ever floated. Reports of a blocktime agreement between ABS-CBN and ZOE began to surface after the Congress rejected ABS-CBN franchise renewal in July 2020, with a tentative schedule offering for broadcasting 20 hours of airtime on Channel 11, and ABS-CBN programs such as Ang Probinsyano, ASAP Natin 'To!, It's Showtime, and TV Patrol were being shopped to air on ZOE TV. Eventually, all ABS-CBN News and Current Affairs programs were declined to air on Channel 11 by the ZOE management due to editorial concerns until January 1, 2022, when ABS-CBN News' TV Patrol officially began the simulcast of its regular edition on Channel 11, marking its return to free-to-air television, almost two years since the newscast made its last broadcast on the original ABS-CBN Channel 2 (DWWX-TV).

Launch and broadcasting
On October 6, 2020, through separate statements, ABS-CBN and ZOE TV publicly announced their blocktime partnership and the rebranding of Channel 11 to A2Z, more than a year after being disaffiliated from GMA News TV (now GTV) and five months after the Channel 2 shutdown. The announcement came a day after Sky Cable, ABS-CBN's cable television arm, added ZOE TV 11 to the channel lineup.

Meanwhile, after a month of launching of the said new channel, the National Telecommunications Commission (NTC) was reportedly investigating ABS-CBN and ZOE Broadcasting Network to determine if the said blocktime agreement of the two stations was processed in legal ways.

On November 12, 2020, A2Z started its broadcast on digital terrestrial television. The channel is available on most digital TV boxes, including ABS-CBN TVplus Digital TV Receiver, GMA Affordabox and Sulit TV.

Partnership with PCMC and digital terrestrial expansion
On September 18, 2021, A2Z entered a partnership agreement with Philippine Collective Media Corporation for affiliation to broadcast the network via Channel 12 in selected parts of Eastern Visayas.

In January 2022, ZOE Broadcasting Network began its expansion rollout on airing A2Z and Light TV outside Mega Manila through digital terrestrial frequency reach via Channel 20 as a provisional authority.

Programming

As part of the blocktime agreement between ABS-CBN and ZOE TV, A2Z's programming primarily includes selected ABS-CBN programs from Kapamilya Channel and its other sister television networks. In addition, similar to its previous airtime lease with GMA/Citynet for Channel 11, A2Z also features content from ZOE TV's sister station Light TV and its content partners CBN Asia and Trinity Broadcasting Network.

The channel's programming blocks are listed in alphabetical order: 
 A2Z Primetanghali — a noontime programming block
 A2Z Primetime — a weeknight evening programming block, featuring local Filipino dramas by ABS-CBN Entertainment, along with two news programs.
 Kidz Toon Time — a weekday morning animation block. The block formerly aired every weekday afternoons since the channel's debut.
 Kidz Weekend — a weekend morning programming block, featuring animated series, kid-oriented shows and educational programs.
 Libreng Zine — a movie programming block:
 Afternoon Zinema — a film presentation of local Filipino films. It was formerly known as Primetime Zinema.
 FPJ: Da King — a film presentation of classic Filipino action films starred by Fernando Poe Jr.
 Zine Aksyon — a film presentation of classic Filipino action films.
 Zinema sa Umaga — a film presentation of Filipino-dubbed foreign films.
 School Anywhere — an educational programming block, featuring Knowledge Channel programs. It was formerly known as School at Home.

References

ZOE Broadcasting Network
2020 establishments in the Philippines
Filipino-language television stations
Television networks in the Philippines
Television channels and stations established in 2020